Jonathan Edward Williams (born August 21, 1988) is a former American football running back. He played college football at East Carolina University and attended Junius H. Rose High School in Greenville, North Carolina. He has also been a member of the Cincinnati Bengals, Calgary Stampeders and Ottawa Redblacks.

Early years
Williams played high school football for the Junius H. Rose High School Rampants. He helped the Rampants complete back-to-back 16-0 seasons, winning the Class 4A State Championships both years as a junior and senior. He earned all-conference and all-area honors in 2005 and 2006 and was a third-team All-America selection as a senior by EA Sports.

College career
Williams played for the East Carolina Pirates from 2007 to 2010. He finished his college career with 1,415 rushing yards and 16 rushing touchdowns.

Professional career

Cincinnati Bengals
Williams was signed by the Cincinnati Bengals on July 28, 2011 after going undrafted in the 2011 NFL Draft. He was released by the Bengals on August 23, 2011.

Calgary Stampeders
Williams signed with the Calgary Stampeders on June 23, 2013. He was released by the Stampeders on October 2, 2013.

Ottawa Redblacks
Williams was signed to the Ottawa Redblacks' practice roster on September 15, 2014. He was promoted to the active roster on September 25, 2014. He was named CFL Offensive Player of the Week for Week 15 of the 2014 CFL season for recording 180 rushing yards, two rushing TDs  and two receptions for 49 yards. Williams became a free agent after the 2014 season.

References

External links
Just Sports Stats
College stats
NFL Draft Scout
Ottawa Redblacks profile

1988 births
African-American players of American football
African-American players of Canadian football
American football running backs
Calgary Stampeders players
Canadian football running backs
East Carolina Pirates football players
Living people
Ottawa Redblacks players
People from Smithfield, North Carolina
Players of American football from North Carolina
21st-century African-American sportspeople
20th-century African-American people